Paul Brannigan (born 14 September 1986) is a Scottish actor best known for his roles as Gareth O'Connor in Scottish soap opera River City and as Robbie in the film The Angels' Share (2012). Brannigan also appeared in the 2013 movie Under the Skin.

Early life 
Brannigan was born in Glasgow, Scotland. He was brought up in the rough working-class East End Barrowfield area of Glasgow. Both of his parents were long-term drug addicts and much of his youth was spent amidst gang violence and petty crime. He was a gang member in Glasgow and served time in a young offenders institution.

Career 
Brannigan began his film career as Robbie in the 2012 Ken Loach dark comedy film, The Angels' Share, which is set largely in Glasgow and the Scottish Highlands. He was nominated for a BAFTA Scotland award for Best Actor for this role. Brannigan was originally cast in a one-off appearance in the BBC Scotland soap opera River City, but in spring 2013 returned for a recurring role as Gareth O'Connor. He left the programme in September 2013.

Brannigan had parts in the movies Under the Skin and Sunshine on Leith, and in 2014 appeared as Scotty in the fifth series of Irish crime drama Love/Hate and as Michael in the UK thriller Beyond.

Personal life 
Brannigan lives with his fiancée, Sheree Coutts, and their son Leo. His cousin Kevin Brannigan, who also grew up in Barrowfield, is a drag artist.

Brannigan was arrested by officers from Police Scotland on New Year's Day 2020 following an assault on David Brannigan, thought to be Paul's brother.  He appeared at Glasgow Sheriff Court where he was charged with assault to severe injury and permanent disfigurement. At court he made no plea and was released on bail pending a further hearing.

Filmography

Film

Television

References

External links 
 
 

Living people
Male actors from Glasgow
Scottish male film actors
Scottish male television actors
1986 births
21st-century Scottish male actors